The speckled pigeon (Columba guinea), or (African) rock pigeon, is a pigeon that is a resident breeding bird in much of Africa south of the Sahara. It is a common and widespread species in open habitats over much of its range, although there are sizable gaps in its distribution.  It is sometimes referred to as the Guinea pigeon due to its similar coloring to some species of guineafowl.

Taxonomy
In 1747 the English naturalist George Edwards included a description and an illustration of the speckled pigeon in the second volume of his A Natural History of Uncommon Birds. His hand-coloured etching was made from two live birds at the home of the Duke of Richmond in London. Edwards was told that the pigeons had been brought from the inland region of Guinea in West Africa. When in 1758 the Swedish naturalist Carl Linnaeus updated his Systema Naturae for the tenth edition, he placed the speckled pigeon with all the other pigeons in the genus Columba. Linnaeus included a brief description, coined the binomial name Columba guinea and cited Edwards' work.

There are two recognised subspecies:
 C. g. guinea Linnaeus, 1758 – Mauritania to Ethiopia south to the Democratic Republic of the Congo and northern Malawi
 C. g. phaeonota Gray, G.R., 1856 – southwestern Angola to Zimbabwe and South Africa

Description
This is a large pigeon at 41 cm in length. Its back and wings are rufous, the latter heavily speckled with white spots. The rest of the upperparts and underparts are blue-grey, and the head is grey with red patches around the eye. The neck is brownish, streaked with white, and the legs are red. Sexes are similar, but immatures are browner than adults and lack the red eye patches. The call is a loud  doo-doo-doo.

Behaviour and ecology
The speckled pigeon is frequently seen around human habitation and cultivation. Most of its food is vegetable, and it gathers in large numbers where grain or groundnuts are available. This species builds a large stick nest on protected rocky outcrops and in urban areas often atop covered pergola pillars and on flat roofs under deep eaves and lays two white eggs. Its flight is quick, with regular beats and an occasional sharp flick of the wings that are characteristic of pigeons in general.

References 

 Birds of the Gambia by Barlow, Wacher and Disley,

External links 

 (Rock Pigeon = ) Speckled Pigeon - Species text in The Atlas of Southern African Birds.
 Speckled Pigeon: Breed Guide - Pigeonpedia

speckled pigeon
Birds of Sub-Saharan Africa
speckled pigeon
speckled pigeon